Lodderia is a genus of minute sea snails or micromolluscs, marine gastropod molluscs in the family Skeneidae. This genus belonged previously to the family Liotiidae.

Description
The shell has a depressed turbinate shape and a deep umbilicus. The sculpture consists of a number of spiral keels. The circular aperture is oblique and shows a prominent varix. The peristome is continuous. The white operculum is multispiral with a central nucleus.

Species
Species within the genus Lodderia include:
 Lodderia coatsiana (Melvill & Standen, 1912)
 Lodderia eumorpha (Suter, 1908)
 Lodderia eumorpha cookiana (Dell, 1952)
 Lodderia eumorpha eumorpha (Suter, 1908)
 Lodderia iota (Powell, 1940)
 Lodderia lodderae Petterd, 1884
 † Lodderia mandulana C. Beets, 1984
 Lodderia novemcarinata (Melvill, 1906)
 Lodderia waitemata (Powell, 1940)
Species brought into synonymy
 Lodderia virginiae (Jousseaume, 1872): synonym of Cyclostrema virginiae Jousseaume, 1872

References

 Powell A. W. B., New Zealand Mollusca, William Collins Publishers Ltd, Auckland, New Zealand 1979 
 GBIF

 
Skeneidae
Extant Miocene first appearances
Gastropod genera